Unión is a village and municipality in San Luis Province, Argentina, it is located at the intersection of National Route 188 and Provincial Route 3, in the southern of the province.

Transport

Highways

National Route 188 
National Route 188 connects Unión to General Alvear,  to the west, and Realicó,  to the east.

Provincial Route 3 
Provincial Route 3 connects Unión to San Luis City,  to the north, and La Pampa Province,  to the south.

Unión train station 
Unión had a railway station opened in 1907 and abandoned in 1977.

References

External links 
 Unión official website (Spanish)

Populated places in San Luis Province
Populated places established in 1910